Juan Martín Parodi  (born 22 September 1974 in Paysandú) is a retired Uruguayan footballer.

Club career
Parodi has spent most of his career in Uruguay, Argentina, Mexico and Greece, notably playing for Nacional in the Primera División Uruguaya as well as Deportivo Español and Colón in the Primera División de Argentina, Toros Neza in the Primera División de México, and Olympiakos Volou in the Beta Ethniki. He last played for Colombian side Deportivo Pereira.

International career
Parodi made three appearances for the senior Uruguay national football team during 2004.

References

External links
 

1974 births
Living people
Uruguayan footballers
Footballers from Paysandú
Uruguay international footballers
Club Nacional de Football players
Huracán de Tres Arroyos footballers
Defensor Sporting players
Deportivo Español footballers
Deportivo Pereira footballers
Club Atlético Colón footballers
Olympiacos Volos F.C. players
Club Atlético Zacatepec players
Al Ahli Club (Dubai) players
Panionios F.C. players
Club Olimpia footballers
Toros Neza footballers
2004 Copa América players
Uruguayan Primera División players
Argentine Primera División players
Categoría Primera A players
Liga MX players
UAE Pro League players
Uruguayan expatriate footballers
Expatriate footballers in Argentina
Expatriate footballers in Colombia
Expatriate footballers in Greece
Expatriate footballers in Mexico
Expatriate footballers in Paraguay
Expatriate footballers in the United Arab Emirates
Uruguayan expatriate sportspeople in Argentina
Uruguayan expatriate sportspeople in Colombia
Uruguayan expatriate sportspeople in Greece
Uruguayan expatriate sportspeople in Mexico
Uruguayan expatriate sportspeople in Paraguay
Uruguayan expatriate sportspeople in the United Arab Emirates
Association football midfielders